From a Native Son: Selected Essays on Indigenism, 1985–1995 is a 1996 book by Ward Churchill.  It is a collection of 23 previously published essays on various topics relevant to the indigenous peoples of the Americas (particularly of North America) in relation to their experience of being colonized.  It is introduced by Howard Zinn.

Publishing information
It was published by South End Press in 1996 as a 588-page hardcover and paperback.

Synopsis
The book brings together a decade of Churchill's writings on American Indian history, culture, and political activism.  The essays explore the themes "of genocide in the Americas, historical/legal (re)interpretation of the processes of conquest and colonization, literary/cinematic criticism, and the positing of indigenist alternatives to the status quo."  The author gives his assessments of how Indians are represented on film, in literature, and in academic institutions in order to support his case for believing in an ongoing "systematic cultural extermination".  He analyses "Indian resistance--as it occurs in art, cultural practice, and activist struggle..."

The book is dedicated "for Aunt Bonnie, who inspired me more than she knew..."

Criticism 
The scholar Elizabeth Zahrt Geib, writing in Feminist Economics, stated that though the book was "thoroughly researched" and benefited from a "highly articulate hypothesis", she ultimately feared that due to the author presuming a familiarity with Postmodern theory on the part of the reader, that "some of the impacts of the essays could be lost on readers."

Awards
The book won the 1997 Gustavus Myers Award for Outstanding Books on Human Rights.

Contents
Introduction by Howard Zinn
Deconstructing the Columbus Myth: Was the "Great Discoverer" Italian or Spanish, Nazi or Jew?
Since Predator Came: A Survey of Native North America Since 1492
The Earth is Our Mother: Struggles for American Indian Land and Liberation in the Contemporary United States
Genocide in Arizona?: The "Navajo-Hopi Land Dispute" in Perspective
Native North America: The Political Economy of Radioactive Colonialism, with Winona LaDuke
Like Sand in the Wind: The Making of an American Indian Diaspora in the United States
Death Squads in the United States: Confessions of a Government Terrorist
White Studies: The Intellectual Imperialism of U.S. Higher Education
Literature and the Colonization of American Indians
A Little Matter of Genocide: Colonialism and the Expropriation of Indigenous Spiritual Tradition in Academia
Another Dry White Season: Jerry Mander's In the Absence of the Sacred
Spiritual Hucksterism: The Rise of the Plastic Medicine Men
Indians "R" Us: Reflections on the "Men's Movement"
Fantasies of the Master Race: Categories of Stereotyping American Indians in Film
Lawrence of South Dakota: Dances with Wolves and the Maintenance of the American Empire
And They Did It Like Dogs in the Dirt ...: An Indigenist Analysis of Black Robe
Let's Spread the "Fun" Around: The Issue of Sports Team Names and Mascots
In the Matter of Julius Streicher: Applying Nuremberg Standards to the United States
Semantic Masturbation on the Left: A Barrier to Unity and Action
False Promises: An Indigenist Perspective on Marxist Theory and Practice
Nobody's Pet Poodle: Jimmie Durham, an Artist for Native North America
Another Vision of America: Simon J. Ortiz's From Sand Creek
I Am Indigenist: Notes on the Ideology of the Fourth World
Works by Author, 1980-1996
Index

Notes 

 

1996 non-fiction books
Non-fiction books about Native Americans
Books about indigenous rights
Books by Ward Churchill
American essay collections